Sam Harper is an American filmmaker.

Career

Harper was born into an artistic family with a father who was a painter and a mother who was a writer. After college, he worked as a reporter and associate editor for the advertising industry trade publication Advertising Age in New York City before coming to California to work as a story analyst. Harper's primary role has been a screenwriter but he has been a director and producer as well. Many of Harper's films have received mixed to neutral reviews from film critics but have been highly profitable at the box office in terms of gross receipts. He is perhaps best known for the 2003 romantic comedy film Just Married starring Ashton Kutcher and Brittany Murphy which achieved neutral to negative reviews but which had substantial profitability. Harper based the story, in part, on his own self-declared less-than-idyllic honeymoon in Italy with his wife. Harper worked with Jamie Foxx on Rio, Martin Lawrence on Open Season, David Moscow on Just Married, and Bonnie Hunt on Cheaper by the Dozen. He has loosely drawn characters in his screenplays from experiences involving his family members.

Harper is the son of painter and advertising agency chairman of Needham Harper Worldwide Paul Harper Jr., and has five siblings including actress Jessica Harper, composer William Harper, illustrator Lindsay Harper duPont, Rev. Charles Harper and Diana Harper. He is the father of three boys.

Film projects

References

External links

Place of birth missing (living people)
Year of birth missing (living people)
Living people
American film directors
American film producers